In graph theory and computer science, a dense subgraph is a subgraph with many edges per vertex.

The densest subgraph problem is that of finding a subgraph of maximum density. The density of the maximally dense subgraph of a graph is sometimes referred to as its subgraph density. In 1984, Andrew V. Goldberg developed a polynomial time algorithm to find the maximum density subgraph using a max flow technique. This has been improved by Gallo, Grigoriadis and Tarjan in 1989 to run in  time. A simple LP for finding the optimal solution was given by Charikar in 2000.

Subgraph density is asymptotic to the related notion of arboricity and to graph degeneracy.

Densest  subgraph
There are many variations on the densest subgraph problem. One of them is the densest  subgraph problem, where the objective is to find the maximum density subgraph on exactly  vertices. This problem generalizes the clique problem and is thus NP-hard in general graphs. Under a weaker assumption that , no PTAS exists for the problem. 

The problem remains NP-hard in bipartite graphs and chordal graphs but is polynomial for trees and split graphs. It is open whether the problem is NP-hard or polynomial in (proper) interval graphs and planar graphs; however, a variation of the problem in which the subgraph is required to be connected is NP-hard in planar graphs.

Densest at most  subgraph
The objective of the densest at most  problem is to find the maximum density subgraph on at most  vertices. Anderson and Chellapilla showed that if there exists an -approximation for this problem then that will lead to an -approximation for the densest  subgraph problem.

Densest at least  subgraph
The densest at least  problem is defined similarly to the densest at most  subgraph problem. The problem is NP-complete, but admits 2-approximation in polynomial time. Moreover, there is some evidence that this approximation algorithm is essentially the best possible: assuming the small set expansion hypothesis (a computational complexity assumption closely related to the unique games conjecture), then it is NP-hard to approximate the problem to within  factor for every constant .

-clique densest subgraph
Charalampos Tsourakakis introduced the -clique densest subgraph problem. This generalization provides an empirically successful poly-time approach for extracting large near-cliques from large-scale real-world networks.

Locally top- densest subgraph
Qin et al. introduced the problem of top-k locally densest subgraphs discovery in a graph, each of which achieves the highest density in its local region in the graph: it is neither contained in any supergraph with the same or larger density, nor it contains subgraphs with density being loosely connected with the rest of the local densest subgraph. The set of locally densest subgraphs in
a graph can be computed in polynomial time.

References

Further reading

.
.
.
.
.

Graph theory